Rhema Soul, is a Christian hip hop trio from Fort Lauderdale, Florida, consisting of Butta-P, JuanLove, and K-Nuff. They started as a band with the 2007 independent release Worn Soles. Good City Music released the trio's second album Dope Beats Good News: The EP in 2008, Fingerprints in 2010 and Red in 2012. The band collaborated with Gawvi on their fifth album Dope Beats, Good News Vol. 2, which was released by Good City Music on October 8, 2013. Each of the last three albums have charted with Billboard Top Gospel Albums.

Early life

Rhema Soul are a South Florida based Christian hip hop trio from Fort Lauderdale, Florida, who are Butta-P, JuanLove, and K-Nuff. Members K-Nuff and Juan Love were part of a rap group for two years prior to the group's formation. Butta P., married to K-Nuff, had a passion for music as well and the three decided to form a group.

Music career
Rhema Soul started making music in 2007. They became signed to Good City Music after their 2007 independent release, Worn Soles. Good City Music released the trio's second album Dope Beats Good News: The EP on March 31, 2008, and their third album Fingerprints on March 30, 2010. Red, their fourth album, came out on March 27, 2012. The trio worked with Gawvi on their fifth album, Dope Beats, Good News Vol. 2, and co-released it with him through Good City Music on October 8, 2013. The last three albums charted on Billboard's Top Gospel Albums charts.

Discography

Studio albums

References

Musical groups established in 2007
Christian hip hop groups
Southern hip hop groups
Musical groups from Florida
American musical duos
American hip hop groups